Jinhua–Wenzhou high-speed railway, also known as Jinhua–Lishui–Wenzhou high-speed railway as well as the Jinhua–Wenzhou railway expansion renovation project, is a high-speed railway operated by China Railway Shanghai Group in Zhejiang province. This line follows a similar route to the conventional Jinhua-Wenzhou Railway but has stations unique to this line. It connects the cities of Jinhua and Wenzhou, via Wuyi County, Yongkang, Jinyun County, Lishui, Qingtian County, Wenzhou's Ouhai and Lucheng District. It then connects the following railways Shanghai–Kunming high-speed railway's Hangzhou–Changsha section and Hangzhou–Fuzhou–Shenzhen high-speed railway's Ningbo–Taizhou–Wenzhou Railway and Wenzhou-Fuzhou Railway sections.

Stations
 Jinhua South (Renovated)
 Wuyi North
 Yongkang South
 Jinyun West
 Lishui (Renovated)
 Chenzhuan
 Qingtian (Renovated)
 Wenzhou South

Design and construction
This project was built as a double tracked electrified railway built to national level I standards. It has a planned passenger transport capacity of 69 train pairs per day, equating to about 15 million passengers per year. A new service depot has also been constructed in Jinhua as part of this project to handle train maintenance. It has been built with a total investment of 17.97 billion yuan, as a joint venture between the now defunct Ministry of Railways and the Zhejiang provincial government. The construction period lasted four years, ending on October 15, 2015, when testing was commenced. The line was opened on December 26, 2015.

References

High-speed railway lines in China
Rail transport in Zhejiang
Jinhua
Transport in Wenzhou
Railway lines opened in 2015